The 1949 season was Wisła Krakóws 41st year as a club. Wisła was under the name of Gwardia-Wisła Kraków.

Friendlies

Ekstraklasa

Squad, appearances and goals

|-
|}

Goalscorers

Disciplinary record

External links
1949 Wisła Kraków season at historiawisly.pl

Wisła Kraków seasons
Association football clubs 1949 season
Wisla